Balbeuchly (Top) railway station served the village of Auchterhouse, Angus, Scotland, from 1831 to 1861 on the Dundee and Newtyle Railway.

History 
The station opened on 16 December 1831 by the Dundee and Newtyle Railway. It closed on 16 October 1860.

References

External links 

Disused railway stations in Angus, Scotland
Railway stations in Great Britain opened in 1831
Railway stations in Great Britain closed in 1861
1831 establishments in Scotland
1861 disestablishments in Scotland